The 2002 Polish Figure Skating Championships were competition of 2001–02 season.

Senior results

Men

Ladies

Pairs

Ice dancing

External links
 Archive results

Polish Figure Skating Championships
Polish Figure Skating Championships, 2002
Polish Figure Skating Championships, 2002